Björnö is an island located between  peninsula and the mainland in Haninge Municipality, Stockholm County, Sweden.  The island was originally a part of the historical property Lännersta.  Today it is mostly occupied by holiday cottages.  

Islands of Haninge Municipality
Islands of the Stockholm archipelago